Jewel of Jewels is MAX's fifth original studio album released five years after their last album, Emotional History (2001). It is their first and last album recorded with Aki who left the group in 2008. It contains six of the seven singles released with Aki and was the group's first album to be released in dual formats.

Overview
MAX's fifth album was originally scheduled to be released on March 20, 2002, but it was scrapped when lead vocalist Mina left the group amid pregnancy. A singles collection was released in its place entitled, Precious Collection 1995–2002 (2002).

The album was a labor of love according to an interview given by the group in Beatfreak magazine prior to its release. They were completely hands with the album from collaborating with songwriters to writing and producing it themselves. MAX worked with Masaru Shimabukuro of the Ryukyuan group, Begin who produced and cowrote two of three Okinawan folk influenced songs featured on the album. MAX also recorded their first English language song, "It's Time to "Shine!"" which opens the album.

Although the group licensed a "Melty Love" as an ending theme to the program, Rajikaru, to help promote the album, it failed to make an impact on the market. It is their only original studio album to not debut in the top 10.

Track listing

CD

DVD

Personnel
 MAX - vocals, background vocals

Charts
Album - Oricon Sales Chart (Japan)

Singles - Oricon Sales Chart (Japan)

References
Oricon Inc., 2006 MAX - Oricon Style WM Music

2006 albums
Jewel of Jewels
Avex Group albums